In the National Football League, the team captain designation is a team-appointed position that designates certain players as leaders on and off the field. The captains program was implemented by the NFL Player Advisory Council established by NFL commissioner Roger Goodell in conjunction with the NFL Players Association.

Rules
NFL rule 18 details the guidelines for team captains. Within Rule 18, there are four articles that pertain to:

 Number of team captains
 Coin toss procedures
 Choice on penalty option
 Change of [team] captains

Coin toss procedures – Each team can send as many as six team captains to the center of the field. On each team, one captain is designated the "speaking captain" of the delegation. The visiting team or the team designated "visitor" by the referee (if no team is declared 'visitor') shall choose "heads or tails" or in the case of a special ceremony coin, the options on the face and rear of that coin.

After the winning captain makes their choice, the opposing team captain chooses from the remaining two options.

Choice on penalty option(s) – The offended team captain has a choice of accepting a penalty enforcement or declining, except where said penalty is automatically "enforced by rule". In some circumstances, a team captain may elect to "decline" the penalty. This typically happens in a situation in which declining the penalty may mean that the next down should occur (3rd or 4th). A good example would be on an "offensive holding" enforcement, the defensive team might elect a "4th down and 5 yards to gain" v. a "3rd down and 15 yards to gain."

The "C" patch
Players who have been named a team captain typically wear a "C" patch on their jerseys. There is a standard design used by all teams participating in the captaincy program. The patches are in team colors and are worn on the front left or right breast (depending on other patches, etc. worn by the specific team). The number of gold stars on the patch represents the number of years that player has been named captain by a team. If he has been named captain for longer than four years, the "C" on the patch is gold. On some teams' color rush jerseys, plus the Cincinnati Bengals' white uniforms, the stars (and "C", for captains with over four years of service) use team colors.

During special recognitions, the patch may be a different color such as pink for breast cancer awareness or camouflage for military service recognition. In 2018, NFL began an partnership with the American Cancer Society using a multi-color captain patch.

Some teams (e.g. Pittsburgh and New England) do not use the patch on their jerseys but still designate captains.The decision to wear or not wear patches can come from the coach or a team vote. Pittsburgh and New England have never used the patch during the respective lengthy tenures of their head coaches Mike Tomlin and Bill Belichick, although they have named permanent captains. To date, these two teams and the Ravens have never worn the patch.

Other teams who do not use the patch designate captains weekly. John Harbaugh has followed this practice since becoming head coach of the Baltimore Ravens. In the case of the Green Bay Packers, the team named weekly captains during the regular season, but would switch to assigning captains (who wore patches) whenever they qualified for the playoffs.The Kansas City Chiefs followed the same practice in the 2019 regular season and postseason, naming six captains in advance of their divisional round game versus Houston. With the hiring of head coach Matt LaFleur in 2019, the Packers began assigning three weekly captains alongside three permanent captains.

By and large, teams do not adorn the jerseys of weekly captains with patches. However, in 2019 the Carolina Panthers voted Gerald McCoy as a captain for their Week 2 matchup with the Tampa Bay Buccaneers and affixed a patch to his jersey. He continued wearing the patch as the season continued in light of an injury to Kawann Short. Similarly, London native Efe Obada was voted a team captain for the Panthers' game there in 2019.

In 2019, the NFL changed captains' patches slightly, removing the white outline at the patch's edge. Also, instead of stars "filled-in" with gold coloring to indicate years as a captain alongside "unfilled-in" white stars (i.e. a player who was in his second year as a captain would have 2 gold stars and 2 white stars on his patch), the patch now simply has gold stars indicating years served.

Designation
While NFL rules state that teams may name up to six captains, this rule is not strictly enforced. In 2019, four teams named seven captains at the beginning of the regular season: the Detroit Lions, Minnesota Vikings, New England Patriots, and New York Giants. That same year, the Carolina Panthers dressed seven players wearing captain patches for their week 2 matchup against Tampa Bay: Cam Newton, Greg Olsen, Trai Turner, Luke Kuechly, Gerald McCoy, Kawann Short, and Colin Jones.

Captains are sometimes decided by team-wide vote, and other times are chosen by the team's head coach. Captains are generally named after the preseason ends, and just prior to the start of the regular season. In the event of an injury to a team captain requiring them to miss one or more games during the season, a replacement may be named. The decision to name (whether weekly or permanently) or not name captains rests with the head coach, who can suspend captainships should they so choose.

One notable example of suspension occurred when the New York Jets ended the use of designated team captains after an incident involving Santonio Holmes in a 2011 game. In the fourth quarter of the final game of the 2011 season against the Miami Dolphins, Holmes appeared to get into an argument with Jets offensive tackle Wayne Hunter while the team was huddling. As a result of the argument, Holmes was benched for the remainder of the game, and the Jets ended up losing the game, which resulted in the Jets missing the postseason for the first time in three years. His leadership qualities and credibilities as captain have since been questioned. Rex Ryan, coach of the Jets at the time, suspended captains for the organization ever since. In 2015, under new head coach Todd Bowles, the Jets resumed appointing captains weekly.
In Week 2 of 2018, Bowles resumed permanent captains, introduced when the Jets played the Dolphins.

Because of the nature of the game, most teams include their starting quarterbacks as an offensive captain. The starting quarterback has no other responsibility or authority on field. However, he may, depending on the league or individual team, have various informal duties, such as participation in pre-game ceremonies, the coin toss, the trophy presentation, or other events outside the game. Often compared to captains of other team sports, the starting quarterback is considered the team's leader, even before the NFL implemented the team captain's patch in 2007.

Gold stars
Each gold star on a captain's patch indicates the number of seasons the player has served as a team captain. These are often consecutive, but not always as former Tampa Bay quarterback Jameis Winston wore three stars on his 2019 patch despite not being named a captain the previous season; he wore four stars on his 2021 patch for New Orleans. The Panthers gave Trai Turner a gold patch in week 8 of their 2019 season after he missed 3 games due to an ankle injury, though he wore a patch with only 1 star during his previous game in week 3. Case Keenum wore a patch with two stars in week 1 of the 2019 season, but from week 2 on Keenum wore a captain's patch with 4 stars, despite only serving as a captain two seasons of his career. Teams have often used captains patches erroneously and without regard to the stars, with discrepancies occurring even mid-season. In 2017, Buffalo Bills defensive tackle Kyle Williams wore a patch with 5 stars and a gold 'C', but the Bills admitted this was a mistake.

List of current NFL captains
Players listed in bold currently wear the 4+ star all-gold captain patches. These players have been team captains for at least four seasons, but not necessarily consecutively.

†Indicates teams not using captain patches during the 2022 season.

Indicates the number of years a player has served as a captain, represented on the patch by stars.

References

team
Captain (z)